The Fox is a 1960 album by Harold Land, originally released on the Hifijazz label and reissued by Contemporary in 1969 and on CD by Original Jazz Classics in 1991. The album features trumpeter Dupree Bolton.

Reception

Allmusic's Scott Yanow gives the album four and a half stars and describes it as an "excellent straight-ahead quintet set" and "high-quality hard bop". The Penguin Guide to Jazz rates the album three and a half stars and describes Land as an "underrated composer with a deep feeling for the blues" and states that The Fox, "tricky and fugitive as much of it is, must be thought his finest moment".

Track listing

 "The Fox" (Land) 5:36
 "Mirror Mind Rose" (Hope) 6:32
 "One Second, Please" (Hope) 5:51
 "Sims A-Plenty" (Hope) 6:17
 "Little Chris" (Land) 5:10
 "One Down" (Hope) 7:23

Personnel 
 Harold Land - tenor saxophone
 Dupree Bolton - trumpet
 Elmo Hope - piano
 Herbie Lewis - bass
 Frank Butler - drums

See also
 Harold Land discography

References

1960 albums
Contemporary Records albums
Original Jazz Classics albums
Hard bop albums
Harold Land albums
Albums produced by David Axelrod (musician)